Put Your Hands Together may refer to:
 "Put Your Hands Together" (D Mob song), 1990
 "Put Your Hands Together" (The O'Jays song), 1973